Mayabazar is a 1957 Indian epic fantasy film.

Mayabazar or Maya Bazar may also refer to:
 Mayabazar (1936 film)
 Mayabazaar 1995, a 1995 film
 Maya Bazar (2006 film)
 Mayabazar (2008 film)
 Mayabazar 2016, a 2020 film
 Maya Bazar, Faizabad, a town in Uttar Pradesh, India